Constantin Starck (18 February 1866 – 11 September 1939) was a German sculptor. His work was part of the sculpture event in the art competition at the 1932 Summer Olympics.

References

1866 births
1939 deaths
20th-century German sculptors
20th-century German male artists
German male sculptors
Olympic competitors in art competitions
Artists from Riga